Zoltán Vincze (born 23 December 1974) is a Hungarian football defender who plays for Ceglédi VSE.

References

Budapest Honved FC Official Website

1974 births
Living people
Hungarian footballers
Stadler FC footballers
Budapesti VSC footballers
Budapest Honvéd FC players
BKV Előre SC footballers
Békéscsaba 1912 Előre footballers
Fehérvár FC players
Bajai LSE footballers
Ceglédi VSE footballers
Association football defenders
Footballers from Budapest